Rajki  is a village in the administrative district of Gmina Bielsk Podlaski, within Bielsk County, Podlaskie Voivodeship, in north-eastern Poland.
But further from the Capital Warsaw.

See also
 Béla Rajki, Hungarian swimming coach and water polo coach

References

Rajki